= Mountain View Park (North Vancouver) =

Park in North Vancouver, British Columbia

Coordinates: 49.3553°N 123.0295°W

Mountain View Park in North Vancouver, British Columbia, Canada is a natural park, pond, and upland area (beyond the park boundaries) categorized as a Woody Wetland, inside a second-growth temperate rain forest. It is critical habitat to a species at risk, and one of the few remaining viable wetlands left in the District of North Vancouver.

Forested greenbelt with informal trails, noted in the District OCP as future neighborhood park.

== Details ==
- Location: Access between McNair Dr. and Hoskins Road
- Size: 6.79 ha

== Facilities ==
- Community Park
- Walking/Hiking
- Natural Area
- Dogs off Leash (under control)
